Pelican Lake is a natural lake in South Dakota, in the United States. The north-east shore is part of Watertown, South Dakota.

Pelican Lake once was a habitat of the pelican, hence the name. The lake remains a popular stopping point for migrating waterfowl with geese and ducks using the open water of the lake as a resting area each fall.

See also
List of lakes in South Dakota

References

Lakes of South Dakota
Lakes of Lake County, South Dakota